Luiz Felipe Marques Fonteles (born 19 June 1984) is a Brazilian volleyball player, member of the Brazil men's national volleyball team in 2005–2016 and currently plays for Japanese team, JTEKT Stings, on club level. He is the 2016 Olympic Champion, silver medallist of the 2014 World Championship, two–time South American Champion (2005, 2013) and gold medallist of the 2011 Pan American Games.

Career
Season 2012/2013 spent as a player of ZAKSA Kędzierzyn-Koźle in Poland. He won silver medal of Polish Championship and Polish Cup 2013. Individually was the best player of PlusLiga in season 2012/2013. He was awarded: MVP and Best Spiker of Polish Cup, Best Server of CEV Champions League 2012/2013. In season 2013/2014 was a player of Fenerbahçe Grundig. In 2014 came back to Brazilian club – Funvic Taubaté.

Sporting achievements
 CSV South American Club Championship
  2016 Taubate – with Vôlei Taubaté

 CEV Cup
  2006/2007 – with Cimone Modena

 CEV Challenge Cup
  2003/2004 – with Kerakoll Modena
  2013/2014 – with Fenerbahçe İstanbul

  Emperor's Cup All Japan Championship 
 2020/21 – with JTEKT Stings

 National championships
 2007/2008  Japanese Championship, with Panasonic Panthers
 2009/2010  Greek Championship, with Olympiacos Piraeus
 2012/2013  Polish Cup, with ZAKSA Kędzierzyn-Koźle
 2012/2013  Polish Championship, with ZAKSA Kędzierzyn-Koźle
 2013/2014  Turkish Championship, with Fenerbahçe İstanbul
 2014/2015  Brazilian Cup, with Vôlei Taubaté
 2016/2017  Brazilian Cup, with Vôlei Taubaté
 2016/2017  Turkish Championship, with Halkbank Ankara

Youth national team
 2003  FIVB U21 World Championship

Individual awards
 2000 FIVB  U19 South American Championship – Best Scorer 
 2008 Japanese Championship – Best Outside Hitter
 2013: Polish Cup – Best Spiker
 2013: Polish Cup – Most Valuable Player
 2013: CEV Champions League – Best Server
 2014 Turkish Cup - Best Server 
 2014 Turkish Cup - Best Outside Hitter
 2015 Brazilian Championship - Best Server
2019 Copa Libertadores - Best Outside Hitter
2022 Kurowashiki Tournament - Best Outside Hitter

References

External links
FIVB profile
CEV profile

1984 births
Living people
Sportspeople from Curitiba
Brazilian men's volleyball players
Brazilian expatriates in Poland
Expatriate volleyball players in Poland
Japanese Champions of men's volleyball
Greek Champions of men's volleyball
Olympiacos S.C. players
ZAKSA Kędzierzyn-Koźle players
Fenerbahçe volleyballers
Volleyball players at the 2011 Pan American Games
Pan American Games gold medalists for Brazil
Olympic volleyball players of Brazil
Volleyball players at the 2016 Summer Olympics
Medalists at the 2016 Summer Olympics
Olympic gold medalists for Brazil
Olympic medalists in volleyball
Brazilian expatriate sportspeople in Greece
Brazilian expatriates in Italy
Brazilian expatriates in Japan
Expatriate volleyball players in Greece
Expatriate volleyball players in Italy
Expatriate volleyball players in Japan
Modena Volley players
Brazilian expatriate sportspeople in Turkey
Expatriate volleyball players in Turkey
Halkbank volleyball players
Pan American Games medalists in volleyball
Universiade medalists in volleyball
Universiade bronze medalists for Brazil
Medalists at the 2011 Summer Universiade
Medalists at the 2011 Pan American Games
Outside hitters